Henry Williams (June 6, 1970 – March 13, 2018), nicknamed, "Hi-Fly", was an American professional basketball player.

College career 
Williams played college basketball for UNC Charlotte, under head coach Jeff Mullins, from 1988 through 1992. From his four years with the Charlotte 49ers, Williams remains the 49ers' all-time leading scorer, with 2,383 points. The school has also retired his number 34 jersey. He helped lead the 49ers to the 1992 NCAA Tournament, and to an 1989 NIT berth.

Professional career 
Williams was drafted in the second round (44th overall), in the 1992 NBA Draft, by the San Antonio Spurs, but he never played in the NBA for the team. He spent the majority of his professional career in Europe. During his 10-year overseas career, Williams played for Italian teams Scaligera Verona, Treviso, and Roma, winning an Italian League championship in 1997, coached by Mike D'Antoni and posting a career scoring average in the Italian League, of 21.7 points per game. He was the Italian League MVP in 1996 and he won the 1998–99 FIBA Saporta Cup, being chosen as FIBA Saporta Cup Finals MVP. During his long Italian stay, Williams was nicknamed "Hi-Fly" and "Sprite of Indianapolis" and became the favorite of Verona and Treviso supporters.

National team career
Williams was a member of the senior Team USA national basketball team. With Team USA, he won a bronze medal at the 1990 FIBA World Cup.

Post-playing career 
During the 2004–05 NBA season, Williams was the Charlotte Bobcats' additional on-air talent.

He was the pastor of New Zion Missionary Church in Charlotte, North Carolina. Williams died on March 13, 2018, of kidney disease.

References

External links
 Euroleague.net Profile
 FIBA EuroLeague Profile
 Eurobasket.com Profile
 Italian League Profile 

1970 births
2018 deaths
20th-century African-American sportspeople
21st-century African-American sportspeople
African-American basketball players
American expatriate basketball people in Italy
American men's basketball players
Basket Napoli players
Basketball players from Indianapolis
Charlotte 49ers men's basketball players
Charlotte Bobcats announcers
Goodwill Games medalists in basketball
Pallacanestro Treviso players
Pallacanestro Virtus Roma players
San Antonio Spurs draft picks
Scaligera Basket Verona players
Shooting guards
Basketball players from Charlotte, North Carolina
Wichita Falls Texans players
1990 FIBA World Championship players
Competitors at the 1990 Goodwill Games